Northern Exposure: Expeditions is the fourth mix album by British DJ duo Sasha & John Digweed. Released on 21 June 1999, it is the third and final album in their Northern Exposure series, preceded by Northern Exposure in 1996 and Northern Exposure 2 in 1997. The UK release was featured on INCredible whereas the United States edition was released by Ultra Records. The United States version does not contain the track "Silence"; the UK version does.

Track listing

Disc one
Breeder – "Tyrantanic (Breeder's Underexposed Mix)" – 9:16
Space Manoeuvres – "Stage One (Total Separation Mix)/(Separation Mix)" – 8:09
Union Jack – "Morning Glory" – 4:26
Jayn Hanna – "Lost Without You (Edge Factor Dub)/(Edge Factor Journey)" – 8:09
The Light – "Expand The Room (Four Storeys High Mix)" – 7:28
Sasha – "Belfunk" – 7:55
Delerium featuring Sarah McLachlan – "Silence (Sanctuary Mix)" – 10:05
Chris Raven – "I Know You Love Me Too! (Van Bellen Remix)" – 5:45
Blue Planet Corporation – "Micromega" – 4:19
Mono Culture – "Free (Extended Vocal Mix)" – 6:50

Disc two
Head Honcho – "Waters of Jericho" – 8:48
Mouvement Perpétuel – "Sexuel Mouvement" – 4:09
Stef, Pako & Frederik – "Seaside Atmosphere" – 5:15
Der Dritte Raum – "Polarstern" – 7:51
Voyager – "Pure (Frictions Groove)" – 4:24
Red Devil – "Gamelan" – 5:08
RR Workshop – "Mess With Da Bull" – 5:54
Humate – "Love Stimulation (Oliver Lieb's Softmix)" – 4:24
Breeder – "Rockstone" – 6:22
Delta Lady – "Anything You Want (The Delta Belter Vocal Symphony)" – 8:04
Mike Koglin – "The Silence (Tekara Remix)" – 7:46

Reception
The critical reception of the album was very positive (Allmusic gave the album a higher score than previous Northern Exposure albums).

Charts
UK Compilation Chart: #6 (CD version)
UK Compilation Chart: #37 (Vinyl version)

The many differences between the CD and vinyl versions caused two different entries for the album into the Top 40.

References

External links

DJ mix albums
Sasha (DJ) albums
1999 compilation albums